Gardyne Maitland (7 December 1865 – 13 February 1907) was a Scotland international rugby union player.

Rugby Union career

Amateur career

He played for Edinburgh Institution F.P.

Provincial career

He played for East of Scotland District in the 1884 and 1885 trial matches against West of Scotland District.

He played for Edinburgh District in the 1884 and 1885 inter-city matches against Glasgow District.

International career

He was capped twice for Scotland in 1885.

Family

He was born in Alloa, Clackmannanshire, to Mary Gardyne (1827-1881) and Charles Maitland (1819-1898).

He was the brother of Robert Maitland who was also capped for Scotland.

Death

He died in the General Hospital of Kolkata on 13 February 1907.

References

Sources

 Bath, Richard (ed.) The Scotland Rugby Miscellany (Vision Sports Publishing Ltd, 2007 )

1865 births
1907 deaths
Scottish rugby union players
Scotland international rugby union players
Rugby union players from Alloa
Edinburgh Institution F.P. players
Edinburgh District (rugby union) players
East of Scotland District players
Rugby union centres